Luqman Hakim (born 12 April 1975) is an Indonesian politician, who is currently serving as a member of the People's Representative Council since 2019, representing the Central Java VI electoral district, which includes the Magelang Regency, Purworejo Regency, Wonosobo Regency, and Magelang City. Luqman is a cadre of the National Awakening Party, and is currently serving as Deputy Chairman of the Second Commission.

References 

1975 births
Members of the People's Representative Council, 2019
Living people